"Johnny Panic and the Bible of Dreams" is a song by the British band Tears for Fears, originally appearing as the B-side to their 1990 single "Advice for the Young at Heart" before being remixed and released as a single in its own right in 1991. The remix was later included on the band's B-Side compilation album Saturnine Martial & Lunatic.

The song is named after "Johnny Panic and the Bible of Dreams", a short story by Sylvia Plath that was posthumously published in 1977 in a collection of the same name.

The song features two sets of vocals. The original verses of the song are performed in a gospel style, alternating with the lyrics from Tears For Fears' 1989 hit "Sowing the Seeds of Love" which are performed as a rap by vocalist Biti Strauchn. An instrumental version of the song (without the gospel verses or the rap) also appears on the CD-single of "Advice for the Young at Heart". Some months later, the track was remixed by the techno producer/DJ band Fluke and released as a single in 1991. It became a number-one hit on the UK Dance Chart, while reaching number 70 on the UK Singles Chart.

Although still a Tears for Fears track, the Fluke remix single was credited only as "Johnny Panic and the Bible of Dreams". The cover of the single features a still photo of Keir Dullea as David Bowman from the movie 2001: A Space Odyssey.

Track listing
 "Johnny Panic and the Bible of Dreams" (Mix One) – 6:22
 "Johnny Panic and the Bible of Dreams" (Mix Two) – 5:55

References

1990 songs
Songs written by Roland Orzabal
Tears for Fears songs